The dusky fruit bat (Penthetor lucasi) is a species of bat found in Indonesia and Malaysia.

Dusky fruit bats are species found in Southeast Asia that serve as pollinators and seed dispersers in their ecosystem. Dusky fruit bats are considerably excellent seed dispersers due to their ability to travel long distances (2).

References
2. Manivannan, Y., Rahman, M., Tingga, R., & Khan, F. A. A. (2019). Genetic diversity of the cave roosting dusky fruit bat, Penthetor lucasi from Sarawak. Malaysian Applied Biology, 48(3), 167–179.

Megabats
Bats of Southeast Asia
Bats of Indonesia
Bats of Malaysia
Mammals of Borneo
Mammals of Brunei
Mammals of Hong Kong
Fauna of Sumatra
Least concern biota of Asia
Mammals described in 1880
Taxa named by George Edward Dobson